Shpritsz (the name derives from a colloquial German word for "syringe") is the second studio album by Dutch rock and roll and blues group Herman Brood & His Wild Romance. The album produced two singles. The first, "Rock & Roll Junkie," did not chart. The second, "Saturday Night," charted in Europe and the United States. On the Dutch album chart, the album reached #8 on 3 June 1978, and stayed on the chart for 28 weeks. It was certified gold in 1978, and platinum in 1980.

Shpritsz was re-released on CD in 2000 by RCA/Ariola. In a 2008 poll by Muziekkrant OOR, the leading Dutch music magazine, Shpritsz was voted the fourth-best Dutch album of all time.

Track listing

Singles
"Rock & Roll Junkie" was released (with "Street" on the B-side), but never charted. "Saturday Night" was released as a single (with "Phony" and "Pop" on the B-side); it peaked at #17 in the Dutch Top 50 on 16 September 1978, and was on the charts for eleven weeks.

In the United States, "Saturday Night" was released as a single in 1979, and rose to #35 in the Billboard Hot 100; the single is referred to in the Billboard charts as "Saturdaynight."

Personnel
Herman Brood and his Wild Romance
 Herman Brood – piano, keyboards, vocals
 Dany Lademacher – guitar
 Freddy Cavalli – bass
 Cees "Ani" Meerman – drums
 Bertus Borgers – saxophone
with:
 Dee Dee Dekkers, Josee van Iersel – vocals
 Robert Jan Stips – "synthetic panic" synthesizer on "Saturday Night"
 Floor Van Zutphen, Monica Tjen A Kwoei – female vocals
 Bert Jansen - blues harp on "Hit" and "Pain"
Technical
 Robin Freeman – sound engineer
 Pierre Geoffroy Chateau - co-engineer
Dick van der Meyden, Sylvia Wiggers - cover design
Anton Corbijn - photography

References

1978 albums
Herman Brood & His Wild Romance albums
Ariola Records albums